The following is a list of Teen Choice Award winners and nominees for Choice Music - R&B/Hip-Hop Song.

Winners and nominees

2000s

2010s

References

R&B/Hip-Hop Song